Carlin Isles (born November 21, 1989) is an American rugby union player who  plays for the United States national rugby sevens team. With 202 tries, Isles is second for the United States in career tries scored, behind teammate Perry Baker. Isles has been touted as the fastest rugby player.

Early life 
Isles and his twin sister, Tambra, grew up in Akron, Ohio in foster homes, rarely seeing their mother. At the age of seven the siblings were adopted by Starlett and Charles Isles; Isles credits his adoptive parents with providing the stability and love he needed to excel in sports.

Early athletic career 
Carlin Isles was a gifted American football and track and field athlete while attending Jackson High School (Massillon, Ohio). Isles holds the school records in the long jump, 100 meter, 200 meter, and 400 meter events at Jackson. He was also a part of the record holding 4 × 200 m relay team at Jackson High School. His 2007 100m school record breaking time was 10.58 seconds which was also a county record at that time. Carlin was a two-time, back-to-back OATCCC Indoor State Champion in high school in the 60m dash running 6.83 seconds which was a Division I meet record up until March 2012. He was a state runner-up in the 200m dash his junior year and runner-up in the long jump and 100m dash his senior year in addition to being third in the state in the 100m dash his junior year. In his senior year at Jackson High School, Isles ran a 4.28 second, electronically timed 40 yard dash. Carlin was an all-conference, all-county football player as well.

Isles continued running track and playing American football while enrolled at Ashland University where he was an All-American in the 60m dash and ran a personal best of 6.68 seconds which is a school record. He holds freshman class records in the 100m dash and 200m dash (indoor and outdoor). On the football field, Carlin was an All-GLIAC selection and holds school records for most kickoff return yardage in a game (174 yards) and longest kickoff return for TD (100 yards)

Before taking up rugby in 2012, Isles ranked as the 36th fastest sprinter in the United States with a 100 metres outdoor personal best of 10.13 seconds.

Rugby career
Isles took up the sport of rugby in 2012. He was encouraged to begin playing rugby by Miles Craigwell, another crossover athlete from American football who played for the United States national team. Isles played his club rugby with the Gentlemen of Aspen RFC, based in Aspen, Colorado.

Isles first caught the attention of the rugby media in summer of 2012 when Rugby Mag dubbed him "The Fastest Man in American Rugby." Isles played for the US national developmental team Atlantis in July 2012 at the Victoria 7s tournament.

National team
Isles debuted for the US national sevens team in October 2012 at the Gold Coast Sevens as a second-half substitute against New Zealand, and scored a try in his first minute on the pitch. Overall at that tournament he scored three tries and was one of the leading scorers for the U.S team. Isles continued to be a regular scorer for the United States during the 2012–13 IRB Sevens World Series. Isles was quickly noticed for his incredible speed. A YouTube video posted on December 9, 2012 titled "Carlin Isles: Olympic Dream" further boosted his profile, as the video went viral and by December 23, 2012 and now has over 7 million views. The video closes with the words of long-time IRB commentator Nigel Starmer-Smith:

I've never seen anyone that quick on a rugby field ever ever, XVs or Sevens. I don't think anyone else has either.

Isles played for the US national team at the 2016 Summer Olympics in Rio de Janeiro, Brazil, where rugby sevens was introduced as an Olympic sport.

On February 29, 2020, Isles became the first ever USA player to score 200 tries. He completed this feat in a 19–17 victory match against Samoa during the 2019-20 World Rugby Sevens Series in Los Angeles.

Season by season 
The following table shows Isles' scoring by season on the World Rugby Sevens Series, as of July 19, 2022.

Professional
Isles was under contract with Glasgow Warriors of the Pro12.
In February 2014, he signed to play with Glasgow Warriors. He was a part of the Warriors 7's side that won the Melrose Sevens in April 2014. Isles did not make an appearance for Glasgow Warriors first XV that season but gained experience playing 15's with the Scottish Premiership side Ayr RFC, an amateur club in the Warriors district. At the end of the season Isles decided to leave the club and concentrate on playing rugby sevens in the 2016 Olympics. Isles was the leading try-scorer for the U.S. at that tournament.

NFL career
He was signed by the Detroit Lions on December 26, 2013 to the team's practice squad. During a workout with the Detroit Lions Isles ran a time of 4.22 seconds in the 40-yard dash, the fastest time recorded that year.

In February 2014, Isles left the Lions to take up a contract with the Glasgow Warriors.

See also
List of players who have converted from one football code to another

References

External links
 
 2013 USA Sevens Rugby - Team USA Info
 Profile at All-Athletics
 
 
 Carlin Isles – 2014 Dubai Sevens Highlights
 

1989 births
Living people
American twins
Twin sportspeople
American rugby union players
African-American sportsmen
Glasgow Warriors players
Ashland Eagles football players
Sportspeople from Massillon, Ohio
Male rugby sevens players
United States international rugby sevens players
Rugby sevens players at the 2015 Pan American Games
Olympic rugby sevens players of the United States
Rugby sevens players at the 2016 Summer Olympics
Rugby union players that played in the NFL
Pan American Games medalists in rugby sevens
Pan American Games bronze medalists for the United States
Olympic rugby sevens players of the National Football League
Medalists at the 2015 Pan American Games
Rugby sevens players at the 2020 Summer Olympics
21st-century African-American sportspeople
20th-century African-American people